Live is the title of the second live album recorded and released by Sarajevo-based pop band Crvena jabuka. It was recorded during a 1997 concert at Dom Sportova in Zagreb, not to be confused with the Uzmi me (kad hoćeš ti), album recorded at the Zagreb Sports Arena in 1989.

The album contains two new tracks from U tvojim očima, "Bijeli Božić" and "Sad je srce stijena". On "Bijeli Božić" there is a guest appearance by Plavi orkestar member Saša Lošić.

Track listing

S Tvojih Usana
Bijeli Bozic
To mi Radi
Ti Znas
Svida mi se Ova Stvar
Nekako s' Proljeca
Bjezi Kiso s Prozora
Dirlija
Ima Nesto od Srca do Srca
Ne dam da ovaj Osjecaj Ode
Sad je srce Stjena
Tamo Gdje Ljubav Pocinje

Personnel
Darko Jelcic -  drums, percussion
Danijel Lastric -  keyboards, vocals
Kresmir Kastelan -  bass guitar
Drazen Zeric -  vocals
Mario Vukusic-Jimmy -  guitar

Additional musicians
Sasa Lošić -  vocals on "Bijeli Bozic
Niksa Bratos -  guitar, mandolin, flute, backup vocals
Darija Hodnik -  backup vocals
Jana Nemacek -  backup vocals
Mirza Treterac -  backup vocals
Kemal Monteno -  vocals on "Nekako s' Proljeca"
Emir Pagric -  violin on "Dirlija", backup vocals

Crvena jabuka albums
1998 live albums